KQCW-DT (channel 19) is a television station licensed to Muskogee, Oklahoma, United States, serving the Tulsa area as an affiliate of The CW. It is owned by Griffin Media alongside CBS affiliate KOTV-DT (channel 6) and radio stations KTSB (1170 AM), KBEZ (92.9 FM), KVOO-FM (98.5), KXBL (99.5 FM) and KHTT (106.9 FM). All of the outlets share studios at the Griffin Media Center on North Boston Avenue and East Cameron Street in the downtown neighborhood's Tulsa Arts District; KQCW's transmitter is located near Harreld Road and North 320 Road (near State Highway 16) in rural northeastern Okmulgee County.

Therefore, the station can also be seen through a 16:9 widescreen standard definition simulcast on KOTV's second digital subchannel in order to reach the entire market. This signal can be seen on channel 6.2 from a transmitter on South 273rd East Avenue (just north of the Muskogee Turnpike) in Broken Arrow, Oklahoma.

History

As a WB affiliate
By 1999, Tulsa had become the largest U.S. media market without a full-time affiliate of The WB, which had added broadcast and cable affiliates in three of Oklahoma's primary media markets (Oklahoma City, Lawton–Wichita Falls and Ada–Sherman) during 1998. In lieu of a full-time local affiliate, northeastern Oklahoma residents could view the network's complete lineup via the superstation feed of Chicago affiliate WGN-TV (now standalone cable channel WGN America) on area cable and satellite providers starting with the network's January 11, 1995 launch. However, Tele-Communications Inc. (TCI)'s approximately 170,000 Tulsa-area subscribers lost access to WB programming via WGN on December 31, 1996, when it – along with The Nashville Network and BET – were removed to make room for five new channels being introduced to the lineup (Cartoon Network, TLC, Animal Planet, ESPN2 and HGTV) as part of a company-wide expansion of TCI's basic tier, reducing WGN's availability within the Tulsa metropolitan area to Heartland Cable Television, DirecTV, Dish Network and PrimeStar subscribers. WGN was particularly vulnerable to removal as it had lost access to much of the Chicago Bulls' 1996–97 game schedule due to a dispute between its Tulsa-based distributor, United Video Satellite Group (co-founded by Ed Taylor and Roy Bliss, founders of local TCI predecessor Tulsa Cable Television), and the National Basketball Association (NBA) over national distribution of WGN's NBA telecasts through its cable feed. (TCI did not include its Oklahoma systems among those that retained the WGN national feed per an agreement reached with United Video that December, which kept the channel available on TCI in five Midwestern states.)

In January 1995, religious-oriented independent station KWHB (channel 47) became a part-time affiliate of The WB for the Tulsa market, offering family-oriented prime time shows (such as 7th Heaven, The Parent 'Hood, Smart Guy and Sister, Sister) and animated series from its daytime children's block, Kids' WB. The strict content guidelines for secular programs carried on ministerial owner LeSEA Broadcasting's television outlets resulted in KWHB refusing carriage of programs that contained strong profanity, violent or sexual content (such as Savannah, Unhappily Ever After, Charmed and Buffy the Vampire Slayer) on the belief that they would offend the sensibilities of channel 47's mostly Christian and Evangelical viewership, substituting them with ministry and televangelist programs, sports or secular syndicated programs instead. The preempted programs could only be seen in the market via WGN until it ceased distribution of The WB over its national feed in October 1999. The WB would soon begin to regret affiliating with a conservative religious station because of LeSEA's preemption policies, and began making plans to move its programming elsewhere. On August 27, 1998, Tulsa Channel 19 LLC (a group owned by KM Communications president Myoung Hwa Bae, Northwestern Television principal owner Bruce Fox, and Natura Communications owner Todd P. Robinson, whose companies each competed for the permit before agreeing to merge their applications in December 1996) obtained approval for a license and construction permit to sign on a proposed television station on UHF channel 19, a long-unutilized frequency assigned to Muskogee. On March 9, 1999, Larkspur, California-based Tulsa Communications LLC purchased a 51% controlling stake in KWBT for $4.59 million; the sale was finalized on June 1, 1999.

Channel 19 first signed on the air as KWBT (for "WB Tulsa," in reference to the affiliation) at 8:00 a.m. on September 12, 1999. The station – which became the first full-time WB affiliate to service the Tulsa market at its sign-on – originally operated from studio facilities located at the intersection of East 14th Street and South 69th East Avenue in southeast Tulsa. Alongside WB prime time programming and a blend of cartoons from both Kids' WB and via the syndication market, KWBT initially carried recent and classic off-network sitcoms and drama series, some first-run syndicated scripted programs, talk shows, court shows and reality-based lifestyle and dating series, and sporting events. Since KWBT signed on just as The WB was preparing to add a sixth night (Friday) to its prime time schedule, channel 19 did not rely as much on feature films to fill its evening schedule like other WB-affiliated stations that had joined the network beforehand, opting instead to offer three movie presentations per week on weekend afternoons as well as a 7:00 p.m. movie showcase on Saturdays. Some of the syndication offerings on KWBT's initial lineup previously were not able to obtain local carriage due to the lack of available time slot clearances on Tulsa's five major network affiliates – NBC affiliate KJRH-TV (channel 2), CBS affiliate KOTV (channel 6), ABC affiliate KTUL (channel 8), Fox affiliate KOKI-TV (channel 23) and UPN affiliate KTFO (channel 41, now MyNetworkTV affiliate KMYT-TV) – as well as KWHB. (For the reasons concerning The WB's prior partnership with KWHB, in preparation for the network's fall 1999 premiere week, KWBT included some returning WB prime time shows that channel 47 had declined to carry, as part of an evening catch-up block that aired during the week of September 12.)

For its first week of operation, the station – which branded as "WB19" – was only receivable via antenna, which, because its transmitter was located farther south than the area's other television stations, resulted in it being unviewable north of the immediate Tulsa metropolitan area. On September 20, TCI – which, as a byproduct of a corporate breakup tied to AT&T's purchase of TCI, would sell its Tulsa cable franchise to Cox Communications in February 2000 – began offering it on channel 19, which created the ironic situation of KWBT's UHF broadcast signal interfering with its cable slot on the same frequency. To alleviate this issue and to ensure competitivity with other local stations, in October 2000, Cox moved the station to channel 12 per a channel slot swap agreement between KWBT and Rogers State University–owned educational independent station KRSC-TV (channel 35, now KRSU-TV), in which KWBT management would also provide scholarships and internships for RSU communications students for five years, and establish an endowment chair post in the university's communications department. (The station would include its cable position in its on-air branding in September 2004, when it began to identify as "Tulsa's WB19, Cable 12".)

On December 20, 2001, the Tulsa Communications-Tulsa Channel 19 venture sold KWBT to Spokane, Washington–based Cascade Broadcasting Group. In January 2004, KWBT migrated its engineering and master control operations to the offices of Tucson, Arizona sister station KWBA-TV. The move resulted in the layoffs of eight station engineers who were employed in the station's technical and master control departments. On October 8, 2005, Oklahoma City-based Griffin Communications (now Griffin Media) – the founding owner of that city's CBS affiliate, KWTV, which had acquired KOTV from the Belo Corporation in October 2000 – announced that it would purchase KWBT from Cascade Broadcasting for $14.5 million. Under the terms of the two-part deal, Griffin immediately assumed responsibility for KWBT's advertising sales and administrative operations under a joint sales agreement. When the deal was finalized in January 2006, KOTV and KWBT became the second legal television station duopoly in the Tulsa market, joining KOKI-TV and KTFO, which had been jointly operated since November 1993 and came under common ownership in May 2000. After the transaction was finalized on December 13, 2005, KWBT subsequently migrated its operations into annexed space in the Pierce Building on Third Street and Detroit Avenue; Griffin opted not to consolidate the station's operations into KOTV's original South Frankfort Avenue studio facility (where KQCW's master control was housed after Griffin transferred those operations back to the city) in downtown Tulsa following the transaction's completion, as the building was not large enough to house the expanded duopoly staff (which had increased from a total of around 130 employees under KOTV's final years as a Belo property to around 180 in the period from when Griffin took ownership of channel 6 to the completion of the KQCW acquisition).

On November 10, 2005, beginning with the inaugural evening drawings of its Pick 3 and Cash 5 games that night, KWBT became the Tulsa area broadcasterfor the Oklahoma Lottery. The drawings – which aired live at 9:20 p.m. nightly – were produced at the studio facility shared by the lottery's two Oklahoma City–based flagship outlets, KOKH-TV and KOCB, which simulcast the live drawings until the Oklahoma Lottery Commission began drawing the winning numbers via random number generator (RNG) in September 2009. In January 2006, when Oklahoma became a participant in the multi-state lottery, the station began airing Powerball drawings—previously seen in the Tulsa market only through WGN America, which discontinued national carriage of the live drawings for Powerball and companion multi-state lottery Mega Millions in 2013—each Wednesday and Saturday night. The local television rights to the Oklahoma Lottery drawings transferred exclusively to cable via the Tulsa feed of The Cox Channel (now YurView Oklahoma) in September 2007, where they would remain until reductions to the Oklahoma Lottery Commission's budget resulted in daily drawings for Pick 3 and Cash 5—both of which were switched to an RNG structure—being relegated exclusively to the Lottery's website on July 1, 2009.

As a CW affiliate

On January 24, 2006, WB network parent Time Warner (through its Warner Bros. Entertainment division) and UPN parent company CBS Corporation announced that they would dissolve the two networks to create The CW, a joint venture between the two media companies that initially featured programs from its two predecessor networks as well as original first-run series produced for the new network. On April 10, 2006, in an affiliate press release published by network management, KWBT was confirmed as The CW's Tulsa charter affiliate. Since the network chose its charter stations based on which of them among The WB and UPN's respective affiliate bodies was the highest-rated in each market, KWBT was chosen to join The CW over KTFO as – at the time of the agreement – it had been the higher-rated of the two stations, even though channel 41 had beaten KWBT to the airwaves by fifteen years.

KTFO's status was left undetermined until June 15, when Clear Channel Television confirmed that channel 41 would become the market's affiliate of MyNetworkTV, for which News Corporation announced its formation on February 22 as a new joint network venture between its then-sibling subsidiaries Fox Television Stations and Twentieth Television (the former is now part of Fox Corporation, and the latter now operates as a unit of The Walt Disney Company by way of Disney's 2019 acquisition of 21st Century Fox) to provide a network programming option for UPN and WB stations that were not chosen to affiliate with The CW, in lieu of converting to a general entertainment independent format.

As the station had the "WB" initialism in its call letters, Griffin management decided to take advantage of the new network for branding purposes and changed its callsign to reflect its new affiliation. On May 23, Griffin Communications applied to change the station's call letters to KQCW (intending to mean "Quality Television, The CW"); the callsign change became official on June 30. KQCW adopted a new logo based around The CW's standardized affiliate logo design that August, at which time the station changed its on-air branding to "CW 12," opting to identify exclusively by its Cox cable channel placement; however it officially remained a WB affiliate until the network ceased operations on September 17, 2006. Channel 19 became a charter affiliate of The CW when that network debuted the following day on September 18. Meanwhile, channel 41 (which changed its calls to KMYT-TV two months earlier, also in a move to take advantage of its new network for branding use) had joined MyNetworkTV upon that network's launch on September 5. On September 3, 2007, in order to allay confusion among viewers over where to find KQCW over-the-air or on cable, the station changed its branding to "CW12/19," incorporating its over-the-air channel number with its Cox channel placement. On July 1, 2009, the station changed its branding once again to "Tulsa CW", restricting on-air references to its over-the-air channel number to required hourly station identifications.

On January 19, 2013, Griffin migrated KOTV/KQCW's news, sales and marketing departments and the operations of co-owned website management firm Griffin New Media into the Griffin Communications Media Center, a newly constructed,  studio and office complex located on North Boston Avenue and East Cameron Street in downtown Tulsa's Brady Arts District (renamed the Tulsa Arts District in September 2017); all remaining operations were moved into the new facility by January 20. The facility – which was dedicated in the names of company founders John T. Griffin and Martha Griffin, and began construction on April 8, 2008, before being delayed for three years due to the global recession – incorporates a  production studio (which is sound-proofed with multiple layers of sheet rock and insulation in the walls and ceiling, and incorporates upgraded equipment that allowed for KOTV/KQCW to begin producing its news programming to full high definition); an adjoining  newsroom; two control rooms that relay high definition content; and LED lighting equipment throughout the building and an underground system of 32 geothermal heating and cooling wells beneath its parking lot to reduce electricity costs.

KQCW-DT2 (defunct)
On April 1, 2011, KQCW launched a digital subchannel on virtual channel 19.2 as an affiliate of This TV. KQCW-DT2 assumed the local affiliation rights to the movie-focused multicast network from sister station KOTV, which shifted This TV over to the KQCW digital signal in order to reallocate bandwidth for the relaunched News on 6 Now (which originated as the cable-exclusive news broadcast service News Now 53), which KOTV began carrying over-the-air on digital subchannel 6.3 on that date. KQCW decommissioned the 19.2 subchannel at 8:30 a.m. on March 9, 2016, with a placeholder message appearing on that channel for the next two weeks, informing viewers that Griffin/KQCW was "unaware of ThisTV relocating to any other broadcast channel in the Tulsa area." KQCW-DT2 went dark and was subsequently deleted on March 31, 2017. As of September 2021, This TV has an over-the-air affiliate in the Tulsa market on KMYT-DT5.

Programming
In addition to carrying the entire CW network schedule, syndicated programs broadcast on KQCW-DT  include The Big Bang Theory, Judge Mathis, Mom, black-ish, Access Hollywood, 2 Broke Girls, Jerry Springer, Lauren Lake's Paternity Court, Young Sheldon, Two and a Half Men, Chicago Fire, Schitt's Creek, Relative Justice,  Dr. Phil, You Bet Your Life with Jay Leno and Funny You Should Ask.

Occasionally as time permits, KQCW may air CBS network programs normally seen on KOTV in the event that channel 6 is unable to air them because of special programming or extended breaking news coverage; however, because of channel 19's CW programming commitments, this capacity is primarily held by KOTV's News on 6 Now subchannel. The station had served in that capacity on a regular basis from September 2006 until January 2007, when channel 19 began carrying the CBS soap opera The Bold and the Beautiful (B&B) from the network's "live" feed at 12:30 p.m. (KOTV has not aired B&B in its regular daytime slot since December 1993, when it discontinued carriage of the program as a result of the expansion of the station's weekday noon newscast to a one-hour broadcast; CBS eventually gave KOTV permission to air the soap after the network's late night schedule at 1:05 a.m. in September 2004.) As KWBT, the station carried the ABC late-night talk show Jimmy Kimmel Live! from April 2003 to April 2004, airing it in lieu of KTUL, which had declined to air the program in order to continue carrying off-network and first-run syndicated programs following that station's 10:00 p.m. newscast.

Sports programming
Since August 2000, under an agreement with the team's Silverstar Network syndication service, channel 19 has held the local broadcast rights to select NFL games and ancillary programs involving the Dallas Cowboys. KQCW carries between three and five Cowboys games each year during the NFL preseason as well as various team-related programs during the regular season such as the Cowboys Postgame Show, Special Edition with Jerry Jones, the head coach's weekly analysis program The Jason Garrett Show, along with specials such as the Making of the Dallas Cowboys Cheerleaders Calendar and postseason team reviews. Because The WB and The CW did not offer a full seven-night-per-week schedule of network programs until The CW expanded to Saturday nights in 2021, to accommodate preseason games, KWBT/KQCW rescheduled any displaced prime time network shows to open weekend afternoon or evening timeslots normally occupied by movies, syndicated shows or paid programming (as it previously had done for some Big 12 basketball games). In addition, through CBS' contract with the American Football Conference (AFC), sister station KOTV carries occasional interconference games against AFC opponents of the Cowboys during the regular season, which, since 2014, has also included certain cross-flexed games passed over by Fox. (Most Cowboys regular season telecasts are carried in the Tulsa market on KOKI-TV, through Fox's primary contractual rights to the National Football Conference [NFC], with an additional one to two games per season airing on KJRH-TV, through NBC's rights to the Sunday Night Football package.) Since 2000, the station has also carried Kansas City Chiefs preseason games produced by the AFC team's Chiefs Television Network syndication service.

During its time as KWBT, the station carried St. Louis Cardinals baseball coverage syndicated from KPLR-TV.

From 2000 to 2014, KWBT/KQCW carried college basketball games distributed by ESPN Plus involving teams from the Big 12 Conference, consisting of about ten to twelve games per year during the regular season – most of which aired on Saturday afternoons, with occasional prime time games being shown during the work week – and most games held during the first three rounds of the Big 12 men's basketball tournament. Separately, from 2000 to 2011, the station also carried select basketball games involving the Oklahoma Sooners through agreements with the university-run Sooner Sports Network syndication service.

In January 2006, KWBT signed a contract with the Tulsa Talons to broadcast regular season games from the AF2 arena football franchise, assuming the rights from KWHB, which had maintained a contract with the team for the 2005 season. (Talons co-owner Henry Primeaux cited KWHB's telecasts of the sixteen games played during the 2005 regular season as a partial cause of a 14% year-to-year increase in ticket sales for the 2005 season.) Following the move to KWBT, ratings for Talons home games declined sharply with the team's four early-season road games of the 2006 season producing higher viewership compared to the remainder of the schedule, which saw ratings for most of the home telecasts floating just barely above "hashmark" levels (viewership too low to register a single ratings point). This led the Talons to cancel telecasts of its six remaining home games, opting to reduce the 2006 broadcast schedule to encompass five of its remaining road games, citing higher viewership for the previous road broadcasts (although, a July game against the Bossier–Shreveport Battle Wings was later dropped from the television schedule because of high broadcast rights expenses). The Talons' contract with KQCW was not renewed for the 2007 season.

Newscasts
, not counting an additional hour-long simulcast of that station's weekday morning news program, KOTV produces 17 hours of locally produced newscasts each week for KQCW (with three hours each weekday, and an hour each on Saturdays and Sundays).

On September 18, 2006, following the completion of Griffin's acquisition of KQCW and coinciding with the station's affiliation change to The CW, KOTV began producing a half-hour prime time newscast at 9:00 p.m. for channel 19, titled The News on 6 at 9:00 on CW12 (the program's title was later revised slightly to correspond with KQCW's branding change to "CW 12/19" in September 2007 and then to "Tulsa CW" in July 2009). Debuting as a weeknight-only program that was originally anchored by then-KOTV reporters Omar Villafranca and Jennifer Loren alongside meteorologist Katie Green, it became a competitor to an hour-long newscast in that timeslot on KOKI-TV, which had become the ratings leader in the time period since the Fox affiliate established its in-house news department in February 2002. On that same date, through an agreement with news-talk radio station KRMG (740 AM), KQCW also began airing an hour-long television simulcast of the KRMG Morning Shows weekday 6:00 a.m. hour. (Ironically, KRMG would become a sister property to KOKI after Cox Media Group finalized its purchase of channel 23 in December 2012.) KQCW discontinued the KRMG simulcast after the September 10, 2011 telecast.

On October 27, 2007, channel 19 expanded the 9:00 p.m. newscast to include weekend editions on Saturday and Sunday nights (with weekend evening anchor LaToya Silmon, meteorologist Dick Faurot and weekend sports anchor Scott Smith initially helming the broadcast on those nights). On January 7, 2008, KOTV migrated the 8:00 a.m. hour of its weekday morning newscast, Six in the Morning (which channel 6 had been airing in that timeslot since it added a third hour to the program in September 1993), to KQCW; the move was done in order for KOTV to comply with carriage requirements implemented at the beginning of 2008 by CBS that required its affiliates to carry the full two-hour broadcast of The Early Show (which was replaced by CBS This Morning in January 2012). On October 24, 2010, KOTV began broadcasting its newscasts in 16:9 widescreen standard definition; the KQCW morning and evening newscasts were included in the upgrade.

The weeknight editions of the 9:00 newscast would expand to one hour on June 17, 2013, coinciding with the arrival of Chera Kimiko (who had served as an original co-anchor of KOKI's evening newscasts from February 2002 until January 2013) as anchor of the program; the Saturday and Sunday editions expanded to an hour on September 10, 2018. At the time of Kimiko's arrival, a nightly interactive segment, "OK Talk," was added to the newscast, featuring viewer questions and comments submitted via social media about stories featured on the broadcast. On September 9, 2013, the KQCW Six in the Morning broadcast was expanded to include a simulcast of the 6:00 to 8:00 a.m. block that had been airing exclusively on KOTV prior to that date. After KOTV/KQCW formally began operating from the Griffin Communications Media Center facility, KOTV upgraded its local newscast production to full high definition (becoming the fourth and last television station in the Tulsa market and the state of Oklahoma to make the transition) on January 19, 2013; as with the 2010 upgrade to widescreen SD, the KQCW newscast was included in the upgrade.

Notable current on–air staff
 Travis Meyer (AMS Seal of Approval; member, NWA) – chief meteorologist

Technical information

Subchannel

Analog-to-digital conversion
Because it was granted an original construction permit after the FCC finalized the digital television allotment plan on April 21, 1997, the station did not receive a companion channel for its digital signal. Instead on February 17, 2009, during the first round of broadcast stations ceasing analog operations on the originally scheduled date of the digital television conversion period for full-power stations, KQCW was required to turn off its analog signal and turn on its digital signal (a method called a "flash-cut"). KQCW elected to choose UHF channel 20 as its final digital channel selection. Through the use of PSIP, digital television receivers display the station's virtual channel as its former UHF analog channel 19.

References

External links
NewsOn6.com – KOTV official website
 

The CW affiliates
Griffin Media
Television channels and stations established in 1999
QCW-DT
1999 establishments in Oklahoma